Mirosław Zenon Wodzyński (born 13 July 1951 in Warsaw) is a Polish former hurdler.  He is the younger brother of Leszek Wodzyński.  In 1974, the two brothers were ranked #3 and #4 in the world, behind Charles Foster and the eventual 1976 Olympic champion Guy Drut.  Mirosław was also in the top 10 in 1973 and 1975.

His personal best was 13.55 seconds, achieved in May 1975 in Warsaw.

International competitions

References

External links
World all-time list 110 m hurdles
Die Leichtathletik-Statistikseite
GBR Athletics
Full Olympians

1951 births
Polish male hurdlers
Athletes (track and field) at the 1972 Summer Olympics
Olympic athletes of Poland
Living people
Athletes from Warsaw
European Athletics Championships medalists
Legia Warsaw athletes
20th-century Polish people